Headscan is a Canadian music duo, composed of electronic musician Claude Charnier and singer Christian Pomerleau, based in Montreal, Quebec. The pair combines dark trance and industrial dancefloor-oriented electronic and acoustic music.

History
Charnier and Pomerleau have been active in Montreal’s local alternative music scene, particularly within the techno industrial outfit Insurgent.  Their first album, Shaper and Mechanist, was released in 2001, and was a theme album based on work of novelist Bruce Sterling.

In 2005 they released two singles, as well as an album, Pattern Recognition. Reviews were mixed. Their music was released on Artoffact Records and licensed in Europe to Alfa Matrix.  In 2008 the band played at the Kinetik Festival, and their single "Lolife" was included on a compilation CD, KINETIK FESTIVAL VOLUME 2.

Discography

Albums
 Shaper and Mechanist (2001)
 Uturn 2: An Exploration in Techno (2002, split album with Implant)
 Pattern Recognition (2005)

EPs
 High-Orbit Pioneers (2000) Limited CD release, approximately 100 copies
 Dead Silver Sky (2004)

Singles
 Lolife 1 (2005)
 Lolife 2 (2005)

References

External links
 Official Website
 Headscan on Bandcamp
 Headscan on SoundCloud
 Headscan on MySpace
 Headscan on Discogs

Canadian electronic music groups
Musical groups from Montreal
Canadian industrial music groups
Cyberpunk music
Musical groups established in 1986
1986 establishments in Quebec